Vishal Bhardwaj (born 4 August 1965) is an Indian film director, screenwriter, producer, music composer and playback singer. He is known for his work in Hindi cinema, and is the recipient of eight National Film Awards and a Filmfare Award.

Bhardwaj made his debut as a music composer with the children's film Abhay (The Fearless) (1995), and received wider recognition with his compositions in Gulzar's Maachis (1996). He received the Filmfare RD Burman Award for New Music Talent for the latter. He went on to compose music for the films Satya (1998) and Godmother (1999). For the latter, he garnered the National Film Award for Best Music Direction. Bhardwaj made his directorial debut with the children's film Makdee (2002), for which he also composed the music. He garnered critical acclaim and several accolades for writing and directing the Indian adaptations of three tragedies by William Shakespeare: Maqbool (2003) from Macbeth, Omkara (2006) from Othello, and Haider (2014) from Hamlet. He has also directed the action film Kaminey, the black comedy 7 Khoon Maaf (2011), and the satire Matru Ki Bijlee Ka Mandola (2013).

In addition, Bhardwaj produces films under his banner VB Pictures. He has co-written and produced the films Ishqiya (2010), its sequel Dedh Ishqiya (2014), and the crime drama Talvar (2015), among others. He has composed the musical score for each of his directorial and production ventures, and frequently collaborates with the lyricist Gulzar. He is married to playback singer Rekha Bhardwaj.

Mr. Bhardwaj is the board member of Mumbai Academy of the Moving Image.

Personal life
Bhardwaj was born on 4 August 1965, in Chandpur city in District Bijnor, Uttar Pradesh. His mother Satya Bhardwaj, was a homemaker, and father Ram Bhardwaj, was a sugarcane inspector. His father also wrote poetry and lyrics for Hindi films. He and his family lived in Najibabad until he completed class five in school. They later moved to Meerut, where he used to play cricket for the state's under-19 team. His thumb broke during a practice session a day before an inter-university tournament causing him to be unable to play for the year. The same year, his father died causing him to be unable to continue his cricket career.  He had an elder brother, who struggled for years in Mumbai to become a film producer and later died of a heart attack. He composed a song at the age of seventeen. After hearing it, his father discussed it with music director Usha Khanna. She used it for the film Yaar Kasam (1985). Bhardwaj later moved to Delhi to pursue his graduation at the Hindu College, University of Delhi. He met his wife and playback singer Rekha Bhardwaj  during the college annual function; she was a year senior to him. He is also an avid tennis player.

Career
Bhardwaj started playing harmonium for friends who were ghazal singers. After a few years, he took up a job with a music company called CBS in Delhi. He later went to Mumbai to become a music composer, and he only took to directing films to create the opportunity to compose music.
His interest in film direction kindled after watching Quentin Tarantino's Pulp Fiction (1994), and Krzysztof Kieślowski's television series Dekalog, during a film festival in Thiruvananthapuram.

Music composer
In 1995, Bhardwaj made his debut as a music composer for the children's film Abhay (The Fearless). He then went on to compose music for Fauji (1995), and Sanshodhan (1996).
In 1996, he served as the music director for Gulzar's Maachis (1996), for which he received the Filmfare RD Burman Award for New Music Talent. The film depicted the transformation of boys into terrorists during the Punjab insurgency in Punjab in the 1980s. The soundtrack composed by Bhardwaj became an anthem for the politically restive college youth at that time. He later collaborated with him on TV serials such as Alice in Wonderland and Gubbare. His further projects included Betaabi (1997), Tunnu Ki Tina (1997), Satya (1998) and Hu Tu Tu (1999). At the 46th National Film Awards, Bhardwaj received the National Film Award for Best Music Direction for his critically acclaimed score in Godmother (1999). In 2010, he composed the music for his production venture Ishqiya, which garnered him his second National Film Award for Best Music Direction. He also composed music for Jungle Book Shōnen Mowgli, the Hindi dubbed version of the anime adaptation of Rudyard Kipling's original collection of stories, The Jungle Book. Apart from feature films, Bhardwaj has provided music for music albums such as Sunset Point (2000), Ishqa Ishqa (2002) and Barse Barse (2011). He frequently collaborates with Gulzar.

Writer and director
Bhardwaj made his directorial debut with the horror film Makdee (2002), starring Shabana Azmi, Makarand Deshpande and Shweta Prasad. The film tells the story of twin young girls and an alleged witch in a mansion. It was screened in the Critics' Week (Spotlight on India) section at the 2003 Cannes Film Festival.

Bhardwaj had read a short version of William Shakespeare's Macbeth and wanted to turn it into a gangster film. He had seen Akira Kurosawa's Throne of Blood (1957), which was also inspired by Macbeth. It inspired Bhardwaj to make it into a feature film. He then started working with Abbas Tyrewala to adapt the play. Bhardwaj then came up with its film adaptation Maqbool (2003), starring Pankaj Kapur, Irrfan Khan and Tabu; it was set against the backdrop of Mumbai underworld. The film was screened at the 2004 Cannes Film Festival and at the 2003 Toronto Film Festival. Sita Menon of Rediff.com in her review called it "..a visual gallery that is an intelligent blend of dark, tragic overtones and comic, satirical undertones." CNN-IBN listed Maqbool as "one of the 100 greatest Indian films of all time" in a 2013 list. In 2010, Film critic Raja Sen mentioned it in "The Top 75 Hindi Films of the Decade" list.

In 2006, Bhardwaj again adapted Shakespeare's tragedy Othello, as Omkara. Set against the backdrop of the political system in Uttar Pradesh, the film had Ajay Devgan as the titular character. It premiered at the 6th Marrakech International Film Festival, and was screened at the Cairo International Film Festival. At the 54th National Film Awards, Bhardwaj received the Special Jury Award for the film. Omkara met with critical acclaim, but was a box office disappointment. It however opened to positive box-office response in North America and the United Kingdom.

Bhardwaj's next project was the children's film, The Blue Umbrella (2005), based on Ruskin Bond's novel of the same name. It won the National Film Award for Best Children's Film in 2005. His followup was Blood Brothers (2007), a short-film on HIV/AIDS, with a run time of 13 minutes. It tells the story of a young man who, after finding out that he is HIV positive, allows his life to fall apart. It was a part of the 'AIDS JaaGo', a series of four short films, directed by Mira Nair, Santosh Sivan, and Farhan Akhtar in a joint initiative by Nair and the Bill & Melinda Gates Foundation. The series premiered at the 2007 Toronto International Film Festival. The same year, he also served as a writer for Sanjay Gupta's anthology film, Dus Kahaniyaan.

In 2009, Bhardwaj came up with the action film Kaminey, starring Shahid Kapoor and Priyanka Chopra. The film follows the rivalry between identical twins, one with a lisp and one with a stammer. The story was bought by him from a Kenyan writer. It opened to generally positive reviews. Anupama Chopra gave a rating of 4 out of 5 and wrote "Kaminey is the best Bollywood film I've seen this year. It's an audacious, original rollercoaster ride. Written and directed by Vishal Bhardwaj, Kaminey requires patience and attention but the pay off is more than worth it." Kaminey was also a financial success earning over  worldwide.

7 Khoon Maaf (2011), a film based on the Ruskin Bond's short story, Susanna's Seven Husbands, was Bhardwaj's next directorial venture. The story revolves around Susanna Anna-Marie Johannes (played by Priyanka Chopra) who murders her seven husbands in an unending quest for love. The film was written collaboratively by Bhardwaj, Bond and American writer Matthew Robbins. It released on 18 February 2011 and met with mixed to positive reviews. Zee News in its four out of five star review mentioned: "Vishal Bhardwaj does it again. The maverick filmmaker has once again woven magic with his latest blockbuster Saat Khoon Maaf".

In 2013, Bhardwaj directed Matru Ki Bijlee Ka Mandola, a political satire set in the rustic surroundings of a village in Haryana. It starred Anushka Sharma and Imran Khan, with Pankaj Kapur and Shabana Azmi in supporting ones. Bhardwaj also choreographed a song "Oye boy Charlie" in the film.
The film received mixed reviews from critics, and underperformed at the box office.

In 2014, Bhardwaj made his stage debut with the opera 'A Flowering Tree’. It was based on a classic folk tale by Kannada writer and scholar A. K. Ramanujan. He completed his William Shakespeare's trilogy with Haider (2014), based on the tragedy Hamlet. Set during the Kashmir conflict of 1995, the film starred Shahid Kapoor in the titular role, for which he along with Bhardwaj charged no money. Haider garnered critical acclaim, though was controversial among Hindu nationalists for its portrayal of the conflict in Kashmir. CNN-IBN's Rajeev Masand called it "an elegant, thrilling film that casts a brave, unflinching eye on the Kashmir struggle." At the 62nd National Film Awards, Bhardwaj won the Best Music Director and Best Screenplay (Dialogues) award. It also received nominations for Best Film and Best Director at the 60th Filmfare Awards.

After two-year hiatus, Bhardwaj returned to direct Rangoon, a romantic drama set during World War II, starring Kangana Ranaut, Saif Ali Khan and Shahid Kapoor. About the film, Bhardwaj said: "In history very few people know that India was also involved in the war. On the Burma border the British Indian army was fighting against Subhash Chandra Bose’s INA (Indian National Army), who were then with Japanese army and Indians were killing Indians at the Burma border." The film opened to generally mixed reviews and failed to find a wide audience at the box office.

In 2018, Bhardwaj wrote, co-produced and directed Pataakha starring Sanya Malhotra and debutant Radhika Madan as two quarrelsome sisters. It was based on the short story Do Behenein by Rajasthani writer and teacher Charan Singh Pathik, which he had read in 2013 in Sahitya Kala Parishad journal and had loved. Udita Jhunjhunwala of Mint called the film "real and gritty" with Bhardwaj creating an "altogether authentic world". She however, felt that the film was stretched in length and "squanders its material advantage to pad out a fable that splutters and grunts before it gains momentum."

Producer
Bhardwaj has been producing his own films under his banner VB Pictures. In 2010, he produced the black comedy Ishqiya. Starring Vidya Balan, Naseeruddin Shah and Arshad Warsi; the film was directed by debutant Abhishek Chaubey. Chaubey had earlier assisted and co-wrote several of Bhardwaj's film. The film was an average grosser at the box-office. He teamed up with Ekta Kapoor's Balaji Motion Pictures to produce the supernatural thriller Ek Thi Daayan (2013). Dealing with the themes of witchcraft, the film was based on 'Mobius Trips', a short story written by Konkona Sen Sharma's father. It received mixed reviews from critics, but proved to be a profitable venture at the box-office.

His next production venture was Dedh Ishqiya, a sequel to the 2010 film Ishqiya. Starring Madhuri Dixit, Naseeruddin Shah, Huma Qureshi and Arshad Warsi; the film was a critical and commercial success with earning ₹270 million (US$4.1 million) in India and abroad. In 2015, Bhardwaj wrote and co-produced Meghna Gulzar's crime drama Talvar. The film was based on the 2008 Noida double murder case, and starred Irrfan Khan, Konkana Sen Sharma and Neeraj Kabi. Talvar premiered at the 2015 Toronto International Film Festival, and was released in India on 2 October 2015, to positive reviews from critics.

Playback singer
Apart from composing music, Bhardwaj has also lent his voice for various songs for films like Omkara, No Smoking (2007), U Me Aur Hum (2008), Kaminey, Striker (2010), 7 Khoon Maaf, Matru Ki Bijlee Ka Mandola and Haider.

Craft and style
Bhardwaj's films are often twisted with portrayal of character's with grey shades. He also frequently adapts short stories and plays in films. The Blue Umbrella and 7 Khoon Maaf were adapted from Ruskin Bond's short stories. Maqbool, Omkara and Haider were adaptations of William Shakespeare's tragedies. Some of Bhardwaj's films takes clues from real-life incidents. The Kashmir conflict was shown in Haider, the Mumbai underworld in Maqbool, and Talvar being based on the 2008 Noida double murder case. Bhardwaj frequently collaborates with writer-lyricist Gulzar and calls him his "father" and "mentor". Most of the treatments of his films are like documentaries. Haider was co-written by journalist-writer Basharat Peer, who was an eyewitness of the Kashmir conflict. He evolves his script until the filming.

Bhardwaj is influenced by the film-making styles of Satyajit Ray, Ritwik Ghatak, Akira Kurosawa and Krzysztof Kieślowski. Kieslowski's Dekalog (1989) inspired him to become a film-maker. Veteran actor Naseeruddin Shah says: "I think he makes interesting films, even though I haven’t liked all his works. But even his poor work is more interesting than a lot of people’s so-called good work.”

Awards and nominations
In 1997, Bhardwaj won the Filmfare RD Burman Award for New Music Talent for Maachis. He later won the National Film Award for Best Music Direction for Godmother. He then went on to win two consecutive awards: The Blue Umbrella, which won the National Film Award for Best Children's Film, and National Film Award – Special Jury Award for Omkara. Bhardwaj got two Filmfare nominations for Kaminey in Best Director and Best Music Director categories.

He won his second National Film Award for Best Music Direction, for his production venture Ishqiya. At the 62nd National Film Awards, Bhardwaj won his third Best Music Direction and Best Screenplay award for Haider. In 2016, Bhardwaj was awarded with Yash Bharti Award by the Government of Uttar Pradesh for his contribution in the field of cinema. He also received his second National Film Award for Best Screenplay for writing Talvar. Bhardwaj's Shakespearean trilogy— Maqbool, Omkara and Haider— was screened as part of an event marking William Shakespear's 400th death anniversary co-hosted by the British Film Institute in London. In 2019, Bhardwaj won the Kerala State Film Award for Best Music Director for his second Malayalam film Carbon (2018).

Filmography

Director

Music director

Music video

References

External links

 
 

Living people
Films directed by Vishal Bhardwaj
Hindi-language film directors
Hindu College, Delhi alumni
Best Music Direction National Film Award winners
Indian male songwriters
Hindi-language lyricists
Indian lyricists
Indian male screenwriters
Bollywood playback singers
Indian male playback singers
People from Bijnor
1965 births
Hindi film score composers
Indian male singers
21st-century Indian film directors
Film directors from Uttar Pradesh
Film producers from Uttar Pradesh
Musicians from Uttar Pradesh
Best Adapted Screenplay National Film Award winners
Best Dialogue National Film Award winners
Special Jury Award (feature film) National Film Award winners
Directors who won the Best Children's Film National Film Award
Indian male film score composers
People from Bijnor district